Moner Manush is a 2010 India-Bangladesh joint venture Bengali-language biographical musical drama film based on the life and philosophy of Lalon, a noted spiritual leader, poet and folk singer of Bengal in the 19th century. Directed by Goutam Ghose, the film has Prosenjit as the lead actor portraying the character of Lalan Fakir. Paoli Dam plays the character of Komli, the key female disciple of Lalan, critically and commercially success.

Plot
Rabindranath Tagore's elder brother Jyotirindranath Tagore, a Western educated bright young man from the 19th century Bengal met the octogenarian Lalan Fakir and drew a portrait of the poet saint in the former houseboat afloat on the Padma river. Jyotirindranath, an urban intellectual, exchanges views with the man of native wisdom. Their exchange of ideas forms the cinematic narrative of this film. The narrative is a saga of the life and time of Lalan Fakir and his liberal sect who lived a life of high order in an otherwise superstitious 19th century Indian society. Lalan inherited the best of the liberal and enlightened tradition of Hinduism, Buddhism and Islam to develop a philosophy of life which is extremely secular and tolerant. Thus became an easy prey for the fundamentalists from the Hindu and the Muslim institutions. They were the parallel stream flowing freely in the heart of rural Bengal when men like Tagore were germinating ideas of the Bengal Renaissance. The love and compassion of Lalan is relevant more than ever in today's world of intolerance and hate.

Cast
 Prosenjit Chatterjee as Lalon
 Priyanshu Chatterjee as Jyotirindranath Tagore
 Chanchal Chowdhury as Kaluah
 Raisul Islam Asad as Siraj Saain
 Gulshan Ara Champa as Padmabati, Lalon's mother
 Sudeshna Swayamprabha as Golapi
 Shantilal Mukherjee as Kangal Harinath
 Paoli Dam as Komli
 Shuvra Kundu as Bhanumati
 Anirban Guha as Mir Mosharraf Hossain
 Shahed Ali as Duddu Shah

Awards
The film won Golden Peacock (Best Film) at the 41st International Film Festival of India, in 2010. The movie has also won the award for Best Feature Film on National Integration and National Film Award for Best Make-up Artist at 58th National Film Awards.

References

Further reading

External links
 

2010 films
2010s Bengali-language films
2010 biographical drama films
2010s musical drama films
Bengali-language Indian films
Bengali-language Bangladeshi films
Indian biographical drama films
Bangladeshi biographical drama films
Indian musical drama films
Films about Lalon
Films that won the National Film Award for Best Make-up
Best Film on National Integration National Film Award winners
Films directed by Goutam Ghose
Bangladeshi musical drama films
Films based on works by Sunil Gangopadhyay
Impress Telefilm films